Christoph(er) Ernst Friedrich Weyse (5 March 1774 – 8 October 1842) was a Danish composer during the Danish Golden Age.

Biography
Weyse was born at Altona in Holstein, which was in a personal union with Denmark. He gained much interest in music in his hometown and Hamburg, where C.P.E. Bach was the municipal director of music. At age fifteen (1789), Weyse was sent to live with his uncle  in Copenhagen to be educated, and lived there for the rest of his life. While in Copenhagen he studied music with Johann Abraham Peter Schulz. Schulz helped Weyse get an unpaid internship at the Reformed Church in Copenhagen. In 1794, he was appointed organist at the same church following the former organist's death. He later served in the same post at the Vor Frue Kirke after 1805.  In 1819, he was appointed Court composer.  He died in Copenhagen.

Works

He was best known for his vocal works, which included numerous singspielen, Christmas carols, a setting of the Te Deum and of the Miserere, over 30 cantatas, and above all, lieder after poems by Matthias Claudius, Johann Heinrich Voss and Ludwig Heinrich Christoph Hölty.  He also composed seven symphonies and numerous pieces for solo piano. A part of one of his works opens the ‘Cat's Duet’ or Duetto buffo di due gatti usually attributed to Rossini.

Cantatas
Unlike Johann Sebastian Bach’s cantatas, Weyse's cantatas were designed to be played after the service, rather than used as liturgical music during the service.

His Easter Cantata No. 1, Hil dig, hil dig, livets morgenrøde, was written in 1836 and its words are based on works by poet Thomas Thaarup. The work premiered on Sunday 22 April in Trinitatis Church.

Singspiel
Sovedrikken (1809) 
Faruk (1812) 
:da:Ludlam’s Hule (1816) 
Floribella (1825) 
Et eventyr i Rosenborg Have (1827) 
Festen på Kenilworth (1836)

References

External links
 from the Royal Danish Library
Opera Glass

1774 births
1842 deaths
18th-century classical composers
18th-century Danish composers
18th-century male musicians
19th-century classical composers
19th-century Danish composers
19th-century male musicians
Danish classical composers
Danish male classical composers
Danish opera composers
Male opera composers